My Legendary Girlfriend (1998) is the first novel by Birmingham born lad lit writer Mike Gayle. It follows the story of Will Kelly who is still in love with his first proper girlfriend.

References

External links
Mike Gayle’s official website

1998 British novels
English-language novels
1998 debut novels
Hodder & Stoughton books